Nícolas Mariotto Sessler (born 29 April 1994) is a Brazilian cyclist, who currently rides for UCI Continental team .

Major results
2016
 6th Overall Kreiz Breizh Elites

References

External links

1994 births
Living people
Brazilian male cyclists
Brazilian road racing cyclists
Sportspeople from Paraná (state)
21st-century Brazilian people
20th-century Brazilian people